The Tanzania women's national under-17 football team represents Tanzania in international women's under-17 football. The team is controlled by the governing body for football in Tanzania, the Tanzania Football Federation (TFF). The team and federation is currently a member of the Confederation of African Football (CAF) and the regional Council for East and Central Africa Football Associations (CECAFA).

The team finished as runners-up in the 2021 edition of CECAFA Women's U-17 Championship and also qualified for the 2022 FIFA U-17 Women's World Cup becoming the first Tanzanian team to qualify for a FIFA World Cup event.

Fixtures and results
Legend

2022

Competitive records

FIFA U-17 Women's World Cup

References

External links

African national under-17 association football teams
under-17